Paula Thomas (born 2 August 1981) is a British gymnast. She competed at the 2000 Summer Olympics.

References

External links
 

1981 births
Living people
British female artistic gymnasts
Olympic gymnasts of Great Britain
Gymnasts at the 2000 Summer Olympics
Place of birth missing (living people)